Sylt Airport  is the airport on the German island of Sylt located in the municipality of the same name. It mostly features summer seasonal scheduled traffic to major German cities as well as general aviation and gliding. Sometimes the airport is referred to as Westerland/Sylt named after Westerland, a well-known part of the municipality of Sylt which however is not the nearest settlement to the airport.

History
The island of Sylt was a famous destination for leisure and holidays in the early 20th century. Sylt's first small airport was established right after World War I, and in 1919 the first scheduled routes to Weimar, Hamburg and Berlin commenced. As Germany had lost the mainland port serving Sylt due to the Treaty of Versailles, the airport became an important way for travelers to avoid entering Denmark, before the construction of the "Hindenburg causeway" linking Sylt to the mainland by railway.

During World War II the airport was significantly redeveloped and enlarged to serve as a military base. After the war, it became RAF Sylt and was used for weapons and other training until closure in late 1961. In the 1960s the leisure traffic came back and developed strongly from the 1970s onwards.

In 1990 Sylt Airport received new technical equipment as well as new passenger facilities. Today it is capable of handling medium-sized aircraft such as the Boeing 737.

In June 2015, Lufthansa CityLine announced the expansion of their services to Sylt: instead of being seasonal, flights from Frankfurt and Munich are now operated year-round. easyJet announced in April 2019 that they would launch weekly flights throughout the summer season to their base in Berlin.

Airlines and destinations
The following airlines operate regular scheduled and charter flights at Sylt Airport:

The nearest larger international airport is Billund Airport in Denmark, approx.  (by road) to the north. Hamburg Airport is approx.  to the south.

Statistics

See also
 Transport in Germany
 List of airports in Germany

References

External links

 
 
 

Buildings and structures in Schleswig-Holstein
Sylt
Airports in Schleswig-Holstein